Per-Ola Lindberg (24 March 1940 – 19 December 2022) was a Swedish freestyle swimmer who competed at the 1960 and 1964 Summer Olympics. He placed fifth-sixth in the 4 × 100 m and 4 × 200 m relays, and finished eighth in the individual 100 m in 1960. He won three medals in these events at the 1962 European Aquatics Championships. He competed in NCAA Championships in 1963 and won 1st place for the 100 yd freestyle. His time was 47.1 seconds. 

Lindberg later lived for half the year in Sweden, and the other half in California. He died on 19 December 2022, at the age of 82. Perry had two children Michael and Michelle Lindberg. In August 5th 2004 he had his first grandchild Hanna Lindberg and later on January 14, 2009 he had his second granddaughter Sofia Lindberg. Both are Michael's children.  ref></ref>

References

1940 births
2022 deaths
Swedish male freestyle swimmers
Olympic swimmers of Sweden
Swimmers at the 1960 Summer Olympics
Swimmers at the 1964 Summer Olympics
European Aquatics Championships medalists in swimming
SK Neptun swimmers
People from Kalmar
Sportspeople from Kalmar County